The International Journal of Structural Stability and Dynamics is a scientific journal published by World Scientific. It was founded in 2001 and covers the stability and dynamics of structures, from conventional land-based structures to micro- and nano-structures, as well as their practical applications.

Abstracting and indexing 
The journal is abstracted and indexed in:

 Mathematical Reviews
 CSA Health and Safety Abstracts
 Science Citation Index Expanded
 Current Contents/Engineering, Computing, and Technology
 ISI Alerting Services
 Compendex
 Inspec

English-language journals
Engineering journals
Publications established in 2001
World Scientific academic journals